Valea Mărului is a commune in Galați County, Western Moldavia, Romania with a population of 3,818 people. It is composed of two villages, Mândrești and Valea Mărului.

References

Communes in Galați County
Localities in Western Moldavia